Odontoglossum nobile, the grand odontoglossum, is a species of orchid endemic to Colombia.

Synonyms
Odontoglossum pescatorei Linden ex Lindl.
Oncidium pescatorei (Linden ex Lindl.) Beer
Odontoglossum pescatorei var. veitchianum Rchb.f.
Odontoglossum pescatorei var. leucoxanthum Rchb.f.
Odontoglossum pescatorei var. stupendum Rchb.f.
Odontoglossum pescatorei var. germinyanum B.S.Williams
Odontoglossum pescatorei var. lindenianum L.Linden & Rodigas
Odontoglossum nobile var. leucoxanthum (Rchb.f.) Bockemühl
Odontoglossum nobile var. veitchianum (Rchb.f.) Bockemühl
Odontoglossum nobile f. leucoxanthum (Rchb.f.) Christenson
Odontoglossum nobile f. leucoxanthum (Rchb.f.) O.Gruss & M.Wolff

nobile